Ektor Kaknavatos is the pen name of Greek poet and essayist Yorgοs Kontoyorgis (Γιώργος Κοντογιώργης; 1920 – 9 November 2010), who was born in Piraeus, Greece. Between 1937 and 1941 he studied mathematics in Athens. After World War II he worked as a teacher of mathematics and then as a civil servant in the Ministry of education.

He appeared for the first time with the collection Fuga in 1943. After 18 years of silence, in 1961,  he circulated in a small circle of friends the collection Diaspora (Dissemination). A pure surrealist, he experiences poetically-revolutionary the paradox of his Greek fate.

Bibliography
 Fuga (1943)
 I klimaka tou lithou – Diaspora (1961)
 Tetrapsifio me tin evdomi chordi (1972)
 Diigisi (1974)
 Odos Laistrygonon (1978)
 Ta machairia tis Kirkis (1981)
 Anastixi tou thrylou gia ta nefra tis politeias (1981)
 In perpetuum (1983)
 Kivotio tachytiton (1987)
 Oiakismoi tou Menesthea Kastelanou tou Mystros (1995)
 Chaotika I (1997)
 Ypsikaminizouses neoplasies (2001)
 Akarei (2001)
 Sta proso Iachis (2005)
 Vrachea ke Makra (2005)
 Sfodra airetiko imerologio tou 2000 (in cooperation with Spyros Kaniouras) (1999)
 To klarino i Safari sto verso tou pragmatikou (2005)

Collected works
 Piimata 1943–1974
 Piimata 1978–1987

References
 Ektor Kaknavatos at Ekebi.gr

1920 births
2010 deaths
Modern Greek poets
Greek essayists
20th-century Greek poets
20th-century essayists